Eduard Ivanovich Apalkov (born 30 January 1970) is a former Russian football player.

References

1970 births
Living people
Soviet footballers
Russian footballers
Russian Premier League players
Russian expatriate footballers
Association football defenders
Expatriate footballers in Poland
Expatriate footballers in the Faroe Islands
Expatriate footballers in Belarus
B36 Tórshavn players
FC Dynamo Stavropol players
FC Belshina Bobruisk players
Place of birth missing (living people)
FC Armavir players
FC Fandok Bobruisk players